Lake Villa is a station on Metra's North Central Service in Lake Villa, Illinois. In Metra's zone-based fare system, Lake Villa is in zone J. As of 2018, Lake Villa is the 178th busiest of Metra's 236 non-downtown stations, with an average of 130 weekday boardings.

As of December 12, 2022, Lake Villa is served by all 14 trains (seven in each direction) on weekdays.

The Lake Villa depot is a reconstruction of the original Minneapolis, St. Paul and Sault Ste. Marie Railroad depot from 1886.  The depot was reconstructed in 1996.

References

External links 

Station from Cedar Avenue from Google Maps Street View

Metra stations in Illinois
Former Soo Line stations
Railway stations in Lake County, Illinois
Railway stations in the United States opened in 1886
1886 establishments in Illinois